SS Gasfire was a British steam collier of the Gas Light and Coke Company (GLCC). She was built in Sunderland in 1936, survived severe damage from being torpedoed in 1940 and was sunk by a mine in the North Sea in 1941.

Building and peacetime service
In 1936 SP Austin & Son, Ltd at Sunderland on the River Wear built a pair of colliers for the GLCC, completing  in May and her sister ship Gasfire in October. At more than  each they were as large as many ocean-going cargo ships, but they were built for a North Sea coastal route, bringing coal from the Great Northern Coalfield of North East England to the GLCC's Beckton Gas Works on the River Thames.

These fed steam at 200 lbf/in2 to a three-cylinder triple expansion steam engine built by North East Marine Engineering Co of Newcastle upon Tyne. The engine was rated at 259 NHP and drove a single screw.

The GLCC contracted management of the two ships to Stephenson, Clarke and Associated Companies, which had managed all of the GLCC fleet since before the First World War.

Wartime service
In the Second World War, Kriegsmarine E-boats and U-boats attacked British coastal shipping both by torpedo and by minelaying. Most coasters were slow ships built for economy, and thus easy targets. They were therefore organised into convoys, but at first these had few escorts and scant Defensively Equipped Merchant Ship armament. Gasfire sailed in FN and FS series convoys, which stood for "Forth North" and "Forth South". FN convoys assembled off Southend-on-Sea and sailed to Methil on the Firth of Forth; FS convoys did the reverse. From January to October 1940 Gasfire made up to three round trips a month between Beckton and the Tyne, leaving each FN convoy and joining each FS convoy off the Tyne Estuary.

Damaged and repaired
On 17 October 1940 Gasfire left Southend with Convoy FN 11. E-boats tended to attack off the coast of East Anglia, in a stretch of sea that British seafarers nicknamed "E-boat Alley". S-18 sank the coaster  and S-24 sank the French ship . A torpedo fired by S-27 blew off Gasfire'''s stern, disabling her and killing 11 crew, but she remained afloat. She was beached at Spurn Head at the mouth of the Humber, and then towed north to the River Wear. There her builder, SP Austin, lifted her out of the water on its pontoon, removed the damage and built a new stern onto her. The repair slightly increased each of her tonnages.

Final voyage and loss Gasfire returned to service on 3 May 1941. On 21 June she left Southend for the Tyne, sailing with Convoy EC 36 which would continue around Cape Wrath to Oban. All 26 crew were rescued.

A donkeyman (i.e. crewman in charge of a donkey engine) from Gasfire'''s crew, T.A. Umpleby, was awarded the King's Commendation for Brave Conduct and Lloyd's War Medal for Bravery at Sea.

See also
, a Wandsworth and District Gas Company flatiron collier that survived an E-boat blowing her bow off in 1942

References

1936 ships
Maritime incidents in October 1940
Maritime incidents in June 1941
Ships sunk by mines
Steamships of the United Kingdom
Ships built on the River Wear
World War II shipwrecks in the North Sea